Baller Blockin is the soundtrack for the film Baller Blockin' by the Cash Money Millionaires, released September 12, 2000 on Cash Money Records. The soundtrack features most of the then-roster of Cash Money Records, including Birdman, Mannie Fresh, B.G., Lil Wayne, Juvenile, and Turk. Other artists include E-40, UGK, Eightball & MJG, Nas and Mack 10.

Music videos were done for "Baller Blockin'" (featuring E-40) and "Project Bitch". The album debuted at number 13 on the Billboard 200 chart with first-week sales of over 80,000 copies in the US and was certified Gold on December 19, 2000, by the Recording Industry Association of America for selling over 500,000 copies in the United States of America.

Track listing

Charts

Weekly charts

Year-end charts

Singles

Certifications

References 

Albums produced by Mannie Fresh
Hip hop soundtracks
2000 soundtrack albums
Cash Money Records soundtracks
Gangsta rap soundtracks
Drama film soundtracks